Naqsh-e Rostam (lit. mural of Rostam) is an ancient archeological site and necropolis located about 12 km northwest of Persepolis, in Fars Province, Iran. A collection of ancient Iranian rock reliefs are cut into the face of the mountain and the mountain contains the final resting place of four Achaemenid kings, notably king Darius the Great and his son, Xerxes. This site is of great significance to the history of Iran and to Iranians, as it contains various archeological sites carved into the rock wall through time for more than a millennium from the Elamites and Achaemenids to Sassanians. It lies a few hundred meters from Naqsh-e Rajab, with a further four Sassanid rock reliefs, three celebrating kings and one a high priest.

Naqsh-e Rostam is the necropolis of the Achaemenid dynasty ( 550–330 BC), with four large tombs cut high into the cliff face. These have mainly architectural decoration, but the facades include large panels over the doorways, each very similar in content, with figures of the king being invested by a god, above a zone with rows of smaller figures bearing tribute, with soldiers and officials. The three classes of figures are sharply differentiated in size. The entrance to each tomb is at the center of each cross, which opens onto a small chamber, where the king lay in a sarcophagus.

Well below the Achaemenid tombs, near ground level, are rock reliefs with large figures of Sassanian kings, some meeting gods, others in combat.  The most famous shows the Sassanian king Shapur I on horseback, with the Roman Emperor Valerian bowing to him in submission, and Philip the Arab (an earlier emperor who paid Shapur tribute) holding Shapur's horse, while the dead Emperor Gordian III, killed in battle, lies beneath it (other identifications have been suggested).  This commemorates the Battle of Edessa in AD 260, when Valerian became the only Roman Emperor who was captured as a prisoner of war, a lasting humiliation for the Romans.  The placing of these reliefs clearly suggests the Sassanid intention to link themselves with the glories of the earlier Achaemenid Empire.

Monuments 

 
The oldest relief at Naqsh-e Rostam dates back to c. 1000BC. Though it is severely damaged, it depicts a faint image of a man with unusual headgear, and is thought to be Elamite in origin. The depiction is part of a larger mural, most of which was removed at the command of Bahram II. The man with the unusual cap gives the site its name, Naqsh-e Rostam ("Rustam Relief" or "Relief of Rustam"), because the relief was locally believed to be a depiction of the mythical hero Rustam.

Achaemenid tombs 
Four tombs belonging to Achaemenid kings are carved out of the rock face at a considerable height above the ground. The tombs are sometimes known as the Persian crosses, after the shape of the facades of the tombs. The entrance to each tomb is at the center of each cross, which opens onto a small chamber, where the king lay in a sarcophagus. The horizontal beam of each of the tomb's facades is believed to be a replica of a Persepolitan entrance.

One of the tombs is explicitly identified, by an accompanying inscription (“parsa parsahya puthra ariya ariyachitra”, meaning, “a Parsi, the son of a Parsi, an Aryan, of Aryan family), as the tomb of Darius I (c. 522-486 BC).  The other three tombs are believed to be those of Xerxes I (c. 486-465 BC), Artaxerxes I (c. 465-424 BC), and Darius II (c. 423-404 BC) respectively. The order of the tombs in Naqsh-e Rostam follows (left to right): Darius II, Artaxerxes I, Darius I, Xerxes I.  The matching of the other kings to tombs is somewhat speculative; the relief figures are not intended as individualized portraits.

A fifth unfinished one might be that of Artaxerxes III, but is more likely that of Darius III (c. 336-330 BC), the last king of the Achaemenid Dynasts. The tombs were looted following the conquest of the Achaemenid Empire by Alexander the Great.

Darius I inscription

An inscription by Darius I, from 490 BCE, generally referred to as the "DNa inscription" in scholarly works, appears in the top left corner of the facade of his tomb. It mentions the conquests of Darius I and his various achievements during his life. Its exact date is not known, but it can be assumed to be from the last decade of his reign. Like several other inscriptions by Darius, the territories controlled by the Achaemenid Empire are specifically listed, which formed the largest empire during antiquity. The extant of his empire encompassed Macedon and Thrace in Europe, Egypt in North Africa, Babylon and Assyria in Mesopotamia, the steppes of Eurasia, Bactria in Central Asia, up to Gandhara and the Indus in the Indian Subcontinent which were annexed during the Achaemenid conquest of the Indus Valley.

DNf inscription. 
There are various and contradictory reports about how this inscription was discovered. According to Mrs. Khadija Totunchi, she took a photo of this inscription in 2017. But she did not find a suitable person to translate and read the inscription. Also, according to Ebrahim Rustaei, in 2018, in cooperation with Abdul Majid Arfai, he presented an article about the inscription to the International Conference on History and Culture of Southern Iran (Historical Persia), in which a reading of the inscription was presented. However, this reading is very basic and has many flaws. But finally, the DNf petroglyph, which had been hidden in the shade and under algae and sediments for 2500 years, was officially and scientifically recorded by Mojtaba Doroodi and Soheil Delshad in February 2019.

Babylonian Transliteration: 1- [mx-x-x(-x) LÚ

pa-id-di-iš-ḫu]-ri-iš ˹a˺-˹na˺ m da-a-ri-i̭a-˹muš˺ LUGAL i-GA-ir-ra-bi

Translation (based on the Babylonian version): [Personal Name, Pati]schorian, invokes blessing upon Darius the King.

Ka'ba-ye Zartosht 

Ka'ba-ye Zartosht (meaning the "Cube of Zoroaster") is a 5th-century B.C Achaemenid square tower. The structure is a copy of a sister building at Pasargadae, the "Prison of Solomon" (Zendān-e Solaymān). It was built either by Darius I (r. 521–486 BCE) when he moved to Persepolis, by Artaxerxes II (r. 404–358 BCE) or Artaxerxes III (r. 358–338 BCE). The building at Pasargadae is a few decades older. There are four inscriptions in three languages from the Sasanian period on the lower exterior walls. They are considered among the most important inscriptions from this period.

Several theories exist regarding the purpose of the Ka'ba-ye Zartosht structure.

Sassanid reliefs 
Seven over-life sized rock reliefs at Naqsh-e Rostam depict monarchs of the Sassanid period.  Their approximate dates range from AD 225 to 310, and they show subjects including investiture scenes and battles.

Investiture relief of Ardashir I, c. 226–242

The founder of the Sassanid Empire is seen being handed the ring of kingship by Ohrmazd. In the inscription, which also bears the oldest attested use of the term Iran, Ardashir admits to betraying his pledge to Artabanus V (the Persians having been a vassal state of the Arsacid Parthians), but legitimizes his action on the grounds that Ohrmazd had wanted him to do so.

The word ērān is first attested in the inscriptions that accompany the investiture relief of Ardashir I (r. 224–242) at Naqsh-e Rostam. In this bilingual inscription, the king calls himself "Ardashir, king of kings of the Iranians" (Middle Persian: ardašīr šāhān šāh ī ērān; Parthian: ardašīr šāhān šāh ī aryān).

Triumph of Shapur I, c. 241–272)
The most famous of the Sassanid rock reliefs, and depicts the victory of Shapur I over two Roman emperors, Valerian and Philip the Arab. Behind the king stands Kirtir, the mūbadān mūbad ('high priest'), the most powerful of the Zoroastrian Magi during the history of Iran. A more elaborate version of this rock relief is at Bishapur.

In an inscription, Shapur I claims possession of the territory of the Kushans (Kūšān šahr) as far as "Purushapura" (Peshawar), suggesting he controlled Bactria and areas as far as the Hindu-Kush or even south of it:

"Grandee" relief of Bahram II, c. 276–293

On each side of the king, who is depicted with an oversized sword, figures face the king. On the left, stand five figures, perhaps members of the king's family (three having diadems, suggesting they were royalty). On the right, stand three courtiers, one of which may be Kartir. This relief is to the immediate right of the investiture inscription of Ardashir, and partially replaces the much older relief that gives the name of Naqsh-e Rostam.

Two equestrian reliefs of Bahram II, c. 276–293
The first equestrian relief, located immediately below the fourth tomb (perhaps that of Darius II), depicts the king battling a mounted Roman enemy.
The second equestrian relief, located immediately below the tomb of Darius I, is divided into two registers, an upper and a lower one. In the upper register, the king appears to be forcing a Roman enemy, probably Roman emperor Carus from his horse. In the lower register, the king is again battling a mounted enemy wearing a headgear shaped as an animal’s head, thought to be the vanquished Indo-Sassanian ruler Hormizd I Kushanshah. Both reliefs depict a dead enemy under the hooves of the king's horse.

Investiture of Narseh, c. 293–303

In this relief, the king is depicted as receiving the ring of kingship from a female figure that is frequently assumed to be the divinity Aredvi Sura Anahita. However, the king is not depicted in a pose that would be expected in the presence of a divinity, and it is hence likely that the woman is a relative, perhaps Queen Shapurdukhtak of Sakastan.

Equestrian relief of Hormizd II, c 303–309

This relief is below tomb 3 (perhaps that of Artaxerxes I) and depicts Hormizd forcing an enemy (perhaps Papak of Armenia) from his horse. Immediately above the relief and below the tomb is a badly damaged relief of what appears to be Shapur II (c. 309–379) accompanied by courtiers.

Archaeology 

In 1923, the German archaeologist Ernst Herzfeld made casts of the inscriptions on the tomb of Darius I. Since 1946, these casts have been held in the archives of the Freer Gallery of Art and the Arthur M. Sackler Gallery, Smithsonian Institution, in Washington, DC.

Naqsh-e Rostam was excavated for several seasons between 1936 and 1939 by a team from the Oriental Institute of the University of Chicago, led by Erich Schmidt.

See also 
Behistun Inscription
Bishapur
Essaqwand Rock Tombs
Istakhr 
Naqsh-e Rajab
Persepolis 
Qadamgah (ancient site)
Pasargadae and Tomb of Cyrus the Great 
Taq-e Bostan (rock reliefs of various Sassanid kings)
 Ming and Qing Imperial Tombs – Royal tombs of the Ming and Qing Dynasties.
 Sacred Valley (Peru)
 Burial place of Genghis Khan – An undiscovered place of burial of Genghis Khan and his royal family.
 Valley of the Kings (Egypt)
 Valley of the Kings (Tibet)
 List of colossal sculptures in situ

Notes

References 
Canepa, Matthew P., "Topographies of Power, Theorizing the Visual, Spatial and Ritual Contexts of Rock Reliefs in Ancient Iran", in Harmanşah (2014), google books
Cotterell, Arthur (ed), The Penguin Encyclopedia of Classical Civilizations, 1993, Penguin,

External links 

Ernst Herzfeld Papers, Series 5: Drawings and Maps, Records of Naqsh-i Rustam Collections Search Center, S.I.R.I.S., Smithsonian Institution, Washington, D.C.
Hubertus von Gall "NAQŠ-E ROSTAM" in Encyclopædia Iranica 

 01
Marvdasht complex
Sasanian architecture
Archaeology of the Achaemenid Empire
Archaeological sites in Iran
History of Fars Province
Sculpture of the Ancient Near East
Burial sites of the Achaemenid dynasty
Buildings and structures in Fars Province
Tourist attractions in Fars Province
Rock reliefs in Iran
Inscribed rocks
Rock-cut tombs
Persian words and phrases